Football Club Partizan Cherven Bryag is a Bulgarian association football club based in Cherven Bryag, and plays in the North-West Third League, the third level of Bulgarian football.

Partizan was founded in 1918 as Football Club Sila. Cherven Bryag won promotion to the B PFG during the 1981–82 season, the only time the club has played in the second level of Bulgarian football. This proved to be the club's only season in professional football to date, as they finished on 16th place and were relegated after losing in the play-off against Metalurg Pernik.

The club had been playing mostly in the country's fourth division before it was promoted to the V AFG for the 2011-12 season, finishing 8th. They did even better during the 2012-13 campaign, finishing in 3rd spot.

Stadium 

The club stadium is the 700-seat Gradski Stadium in Cherven Bryag.

Current squad

League positions

References

External links 
 

Partizan Cherven Bryag
1918 establishments in Bulgaria
Association football clubs established in 1918
Pleven Province